Sant Alís is the highest mountain of the Serra del Montsec in Catalonia, Spain. It has an elevation of 1,675 metres above sea level.

See also
Mountains of Catalonia

References

Pre-Pyrenees
Mountains of Catalonia
One-thousanders of Spain